The Roods Landing site or Roods Creek Mounds (9SW1) is an archaeological site located south of Omaha, Stewart County, Georgia, United States at the confluence of Rood Creek and the Chattahoochee River. It is a Middle Woodland / Mississippian period Pre-Columbian complex of earthen mounds. It was entered on the National Register of Historic Places on August 19, 1975.

Site description
The location is a large multimound site with eight platform mounds. This summit had 3 wattle and daub structures and was covered with a surface of yellow clay with a raised  lip forming a parapet around the edge of the summit. Structure 1 was located at the center of the summit and the other structures were arranged around it to either side. One faced northwest on a plaza opposite Mound E, the other lead to the southwest.

Excavations
Clarence Bloomfield Moore attempted to excavate the site. It reminded him of Moundville which it somewhat resembles. However, he was denied permission. The site was excavated in 1955 by Joseph Caldwell but has not been excavated since.
It is considered a major site with multiple mounds and is accessible only through scheduled tours.

See also
 Cayson Mound and Village Site
 Yon Mound and Village Site
 Fort Walton culture
 List of Mississippian sites

References

South Appalachian Mississippian culture
Archaeological sites in Georgia (U.S. state)
Archaeological sites on the National Register of Historic Places in Georgia (U.S. state)
Geography of Stewart County, Georgia
National Register of Historic Places in Stewart County, Georgia